Koushik Sarkar (born 8 February 1994) is an Indian professional footballer who plays as a center-back for Bhawanipore in the CFL Premier Division A and I-League 2nd division.

Career

Early career
Born in Chinsurah, West Bengal, Sarkar joined the Sports Authority of India in 2010. He spent three seasons there before signing with the Calcutta Football League, Kalighat Milan Sangha. He made one appearance with them before returning to the Sports Authority of India.

Sarkar captained the University of Calcutta football side during the Inter-University challenge. While with the University side, Sarkar attracted interest through two good performances against I-League side, Mohun Bagan.

East Bengal
On 6 December 2015 it was announced that Sarkar had signed a three-year contract with East Bengal of the I-League. A year later, after not playing a single match for East Bengal in the I-League, it was revealed that Sarkar had his contract terminated by East Bengal before the 2016–17 season.

International
Despite not playing professional football, Sarkar was called-up to the shortlisted 40 player squad by India head coach, Stephen Constantine, in December 2015.
On 27 December 2015, Sarkar made his debut for India in 2015 SAFF Championship match against Nepal, thus becoming the 503rd player to represent India internationally.

Career statistics

National team statistics

Honours

India
 SAFF Championship: 2015

India U23
 South Asian Games Silver medal: 2016

References

Living people
Indian footballers
1994 births
East Bengal Club players
Association football defenders
Footballers from West Bengal
I-League players
India international footballers
India youth international footballers
People from Hooghly district
Peerless SC players
South Asian Games silver medalists for India
South Asian Games medalists in football